Finally is the debut studio album by Swedish singer Velvet first released on March 20, 2006 on Bonnier Amigo. Finally peaked at #46 in the Swedish charts and dropped off the chart after just one week.

Singles
 Velvet's debut single "Rock Down To (Electric Avenue)" peaked at #6 in the Swedish charts and achieved the #1 spot on Sweden's dance chart. The song stayed in the charts for 11 weeks.
 "Don't Stop Movin'" peaked at #8 in Sweden and due to the popularity of the two singles Velvet conducted her first tour.
 "Mi Amore" was Velvet's third single and was also her first entry in Melodifestivalen (2006). The song failed to win but it charted in Greece, Hungary, Italy, Poland & Russia. The song was also later announced as 'Song of the Year 2006' in Bulgaria. The song peaked at #5 in Sweden.
 "Fix Me" peaked at #7 in Sweden but became known internationally - the song found itself in rotation in UK clubs. Due to its popularity her album Finally was re-released to include the track. The song was remixed and released to the UK on August 11, 2008.

Track listing

Original release
 "City of Angels" - 3:27
 "Rock Down To (Electric Avenue)" - 3:34
 "Mi Amore" - 2:42
 "Doin' It" - 3:40
 "Strangers" - 4:01
 "Hey" - 3:40
 "The Snake" (ft. Rigo) - 3:18
 "DJ Take Me" - 3:30
 "In and Out of Love" - 3:13
 "Don't Stop Movin'" - 3:15
 "Don't Stop Movin' (Stonebridge remix)" - 8:08

2007 re-release
 "City of Angels" - 3:27
 "Rock Down To (Electric Avenue)" - 3:34
 "Mi Amore" - 2:42
 "Doin' It" - 3:40
 "Strangers" - 4:01
 "Hey" - 3:40
 "The Snake" (ft. Rigo) - 3:18
 "DJ Take Me" - 3:30
 "In and Out of Love" - 3:13
 "Don't Stop Movin'" - 3:15
 "Don't Stop Movin' (Stonebridge remix)" - 8:08
 "Fix Me" - 3:06
 "Fix Me (ft. DMX (DJ Cizo Remix))" - 4:22

DVD
 Rock Down To (Electric Avenue) music video
 Don't Stop Moving music video
 Mi Amore music video
 Fix Me music video
 Photo gallery

Release history

Chart positions

Singles

References

External links
Official Website
Official Myspace

2006 debut albums
Velvet (singer) albums
Albums produced by Twin